Tim Renkow (born 1989, Mexico City) is an American actor, writer and comedian. He plays the leading role of Tim in the TV series Jerk, which he also co-wrote.

Early life
Renkow was born in Mexico City, and grew up in Chapel Hill, North Carolina. He later attended art school in Memphis, Tennessee.

Career

Beginnings 
In Memphis, at the age of 19, Renkow began performing stand-up comedy. He continued in this activity in New York City, before moving to the United Kingdom to study creative writing in 2012. He participated in the Chortle Student Comedy Award Final at 2013's Edinburgh Fringe. In 2014, Renkow performed his debut show, At Least Hell Has Ramps, and was nominated for Chortle's Best Newcomer Award.

Renkow's first television appearance was in 2016, in an episode of BBC Comedy Feeds, A Brief History of Tim.

In 2017, Renkow appeared in four episodes of Bobby & Harriet Get Married, Bobby Mair and Harriet Kemsley's comedic TV series about their wedding.

2019 - present: Jerk 
In February 2019, Series 1 of Renkow's television series, Jerk, was released by BBC Three. It was subsequently replayed on BBC One, and its approval for a second series was announced in September 2019. The series largely built on the characters established in A Brief History of Tim. The show's second series aired in 2021.

In April 2019, Renkow performed a one-man show at London's Soho Theatre entitled Tim Renkow Tries to Punch Down.

In 2021, Renkow was announced as a member of the UK jury for the BAFTA Breakthrough Initiative. He appeared in an episode of BBC's Live At the Apollo Series 16.

Personal life
Renkow has cerebral palsy. As of September 2020, he is married to fellow comedian Spring Day.

Filmography

Television

References

External links

American male comedians
Living people
American actors
Male actors from Mexico City
People with cerebral palsy
Actors with disabilities
1989 births